Stephen Birch (1873–1940) was the President of the Kennecott Copper Company.

Early life 
Birch was born in New York City on March 24, 1873. He was the second son out of six children. His father was a Union Army sergeant who died when Stephen was only ten years old. Three years after her husband's death, Stephen's mother moved her six children from Brooklyn to Mahwah, New Jersey to be near relatives. The young Birches quickly became friends with the children of their neighbors, Theodore Havemeyer, the vice-president of American Sugar Refining Company, and his wife Lillie. "Mrs. Havemeyer took a special interest in young Stephen providing financial assistance for his education at Trinity School, New York University, and Columbia School of Mines."He received his M.E. from Columbia in 1898.

Career 
"At the peak of the Klondike gold rush in 1898, Stephen announced that he wanted to go to Alaska rather than continue working with an engineering team that was surveying for the New York City subway system." While many of his friends and relatives did not take him seriously, Mrs. Havemeyer offered to pay for his trip to Valdez, a newly established city named "the port for an All American route to Alaska's interior." Because of Mrs. Havemeyer's kind gesture, Birch was able to travel to Valdez in the summer of 1898. He quickly made a name for himself in the mining industry and found his wealth in copper up in the Wrangell Mountains, the future site of Kennecott, Alaska. In Alaska, he examined a vastly rich copper deposit in the Copper River region. "He bought 21 claims and consolidated them in 1903 as the Alaska Copper and Coal Company. Equipment and supplies had to be hauled in by boat and horse team to the remote site at the base of the Kennicott Glacier." In need of proper resources, Birch formed an organization and sought out the help of Daniel Guggenheim and J.P Morgan. It became known as Kennecott Mining Company with offices in New York City and Birch as Managing Director. In 1915 Birch had full power and became President of the reorganized Kennecott Copper Company. "As resources were depleted at the Alaska Mines, which closed in 1938, Birch led the diversification into related products and alternate sources of copper in Utah, Nevada, Arizona, New Mexico, and Chile." "Under his direction, Kennecott Copper experienced impressive growth. In 1915, the firm had 450 employees and $11 million in sales."

Stephen Birch resigned as President of the Kennecott Copper Company in 1933 and was replaced by E.T Stannard. "Birch continued as Chairman of the Board of Directors and Executive Committee. In addition to his positions with Kennecott, Birch was president and director of the Alaska Steamship Company, chairman of the board of directors of the Braden Copper Company, and a director of the Alaska Development and Mineral Company, the Banker's Trust company of New York, the Chicago, Burlington and Quincy Railroad Company, the Colorado and Southern Railway Company and the Northern Pacific Railway Company."
  
"At his death, Kennecott held nearly 15 percent of the world's known copper resources and was the largest copper producer in the United States." Also, in the year of his death, "the company employed 28,872 employees and had sales of $177,250,036."

Kennecott Copper Company's original location in Alaska is now frequently referred to as a "ghost town" and is a tourist attraction. The buildings and mills are still standing but remain untouched, as the company's Alaska location closed down many years ago.

Birch is positively renowned for his successful business ventures and has received various honors such as being inducted into the Mining Hall of Fame and being named among the 20th Century American Leaders by Harvard Business School.

Personal life 
Birch married Mary C. Rand in Minneapolis, Minnesota on June 24, 1916. His best man was longtime friend, Henry O. Havemeyer. He and his wife had two children whom they named Stephen and Mary. The Havemeyers sold their mansion and 730 acres of their estate to Birch and the York Room was added to the mansion for his daughter Mary and her husband in the 1920s. He lived in the mansion with his family until he died at age 68 at Doctors Hospital on December 29, 1940. "Birch is buried at Ferncliff Mausoleum in Hartsdale, New York. A stained glass window depicting Alaskan mountain scenery adorns this mausoleum."
  
After his death, his estate went to his son, Stephen. Stephen died in 1970 at the same time that the founders of Ramapo College were searching for land to build the school on. After visiting the land, it was decided that the Birch estate would be the new home to Ramapo College. "The final settlement on all of the Birch property was not concluded until 1972 for $3,133,000 or a little over $10,000 an acre." The Birch mansion is now used as an administration building at Ramapo College of New Jersey. 

Birch was said to be a very private man. During his lifetime, he avoided publicity and seldom gave interviews or had his picture taken, though he did have his portrait painted in 1911 by the Swiss-born American artist Adolfo Müller-Ury. But while he may have been mysterious, it is undeniable that he was admired. Katherine Wilson wrote for Copper Tints magazine that "Stephen Birch is personally little known. Today one of the financial powers in New York City, he shuns publicity and evades acclaim as a captain of industry. But to those who know him he is a man of deep and broad humanity, inspired in all that he does by a keen sense of his responsibility to the national welfare. With his intimates, he is a finely perceptive and generous friend, of an unshakable loyalty. Stephen Birch is an outstanding American."

Philanthropy 
"In 1938 he founded the Stephen and Mary Birch Foundation, Inc. to support health service, hospitals and civic organizations.  It provided major funding for the Stephen Birch Aquarium-Museum at the University of California, San Diego." Even though 2010 marks the 70th anniversary of his death, his legacy still lives on through this foundation, which recently "made a $10 million contribution to Sharp HealthCare Foundation for Transforming Health Care in San Diego: the Campaign for Sharp Healthcare, the capital campaign launched in 2003 to raise funds for a new health care facility at Sharp Memorial Hospital. In recognition of this generous gift, Sharp will name the new facility the Stephen Birch Healthcare Center at Sharp Memorial Hospital. The Birch contribution is the largest in Sharp's history and brings the total that the Stephen and Mary Birch Foundation has donated to Sharp to more than $16 million."

References 

1873 births
1940 deaths
19th-century American businesspeople
Columbia School of Mines alumni
New York University alumni
People from Mahwah, New Jersey
20th-century American businesspeople